The Freedom of Information Act 1982 (Cth) is an Act of the Parliament of Australia which guarantees freedom of information (FOI) and the rights of access to official documents of the Commonwealth Government and of its agencies to members of the public.

History
Before the Act's implementation the various governments of Australia had no obligation to release information to the public, because the traditional Westminster system of governance is fairly closed to public scrutiny. Between the 1960s and 1980s a number of enquiries were made, looking into the transparency of the Australian government and public services which led to New Industry Law (NAL) reforms. One of the NAL initiatives was Freedom of Information and is considered a "landmark in the development of Australian democracy".

The Act
Members of the public have certain rights of access. These include the right to access documents about the operation of government departments and documents that are in the possession of government Ministers or agencies (Freedom of Information Act 1982). Certain documents are exempt from this, including (but not limited to) documents detailing Cabinet deliberations or decisions; documents disclosing trade secrets; or documents that could damage national security, defence, or international relations, or any document that could damage Commonwealth-State relations. The Act protects personal privacy by exempting documents the disclosure of which would result in the unreasonable disclosure of personal information about any individual person, including a deceased person.

Requesting Information 
The request for access to a document must be in writing, and contain a reasonable amount of information about the requested document in order for it to be easier to locate. The application process can also incur charges. Upon receiving the application, the government agency or Minister who receives the application must take all reasonable steps to inform the applicant that their request has been received within 14 days, and must also notify the applicant of their decision in relation to the request within 30 days of receiving the request. If access has been refused wholly or in part, reasons must be provided to the applicant. However, not all documents, depend on the contents, that held in a minister's office will be subject to the Act.

Amendments 
The Freedom of Information Amendment (Reform) Act 2010 was passed in May 2010, and came into effect in November 2010. The changes were largely targeted at reducing the cost of the FOI applications, which had been criticized by journalists as "prohibitively costly" (Ricketson and Snell, 2002).

Some of the changes to the Freedom of Information Amendment (Reform) Act 2010 for applications received on or after 1 November 2010 include : 
 No application fee is payable for an FOI request or application for internal review;
 An applicant who seeks access to their own personal information does not pay any charges;
 For all other applications, the cost of the first five hours of decision-making time is set to be free of charge.

See also 
 Freedom of information laws by country

References

 Ricketson, Matthew & Snell, Rick in Tanner, Stephen (ed.) 2002, Journalism: Investigation and Research, Longman, Sydney.
 Freedom of Information (FOI) Reform, Australian Government Attorney-General's Department
  at Australasian Legal Information Institute (AustLII)
 Freedom of Information Act 1982, Australian Government Federal Register of Legislation

External links
 Freedom of Information Act 1982 in the Federal Register of Legislation

Acts of the Parliament of Australia
Freedom of information legislation
1982 in Australian law